The University of Wisconsin School of Medicine and Public Health (UWSMPH) is a professional school for the study of medicine and public health at the University of Wisconsin–Madison. It is one of only two medical schools in Wisconsin, along with the Medical College of Wisconsin in Milwaukee, and the only public one.

UWSMPH's main building, the Health Sciences Learning Center, is located at the western end of UW–Madison's campus, adjacent to the UW Health University Hospital, its primary affiliated teaching hospital, as well as the Wisconsin Institutes for Medical Research. UWSMPH is active in teaching and research, and extramural research grants received by UWSMPH totaled US$367.8 million in 2017–18, accounting for 40 per cent of all research grants received by UW–Madison.

History 
The medical school was proposed in 1848 and a two-year basic science course began in 1907. Charles R. Bardeen was the first dean of the medical school. The first four-year class matriculated in 1925, and the entire UWSMPH moved into the state-of-the-art Health Sciences Learning Center in 2004.

Rankings and Academic Profile 
The UWSMPH has been ranked by U.S. News & World Report as one of the nation's best primary-care medical schools and among the top 30 research schools. In the 2020 edition of graduate school rankings, UWSMPH was listed as 16th in primary-care education and as 27th among research schools. The UW School of Medicine and Public Health also ranks as one of the top medical schools in terms of research funding and expenditures, with US$356 million in extramural research support and US$575 million in total expenditures in 2015–16. In 2019, UWSMPH ranked 28th among U.S. medical schools in NIH research grant funding received, with US$229 million received. Grants to UWSMPH represent 40 per cent of all research grants received by UW–Madison.

The UWSMPH is an academic center for embryonic stem cell research, with UWSMPH Professor of Anatomy James Thomson being the first scientist to isolate human embryonic stem cells. This has brought significant attention to the university's research programs. Stem cell research at the school is aided in part by funding from the Wisconsin Alumni Research Foundation and the promotion of WiCell.

The school also has teaching and research partnerships with the University of Wisconsin Hospital and Clinics (UW Health) and the University of Wisconsin Medical Foundation, one of the 10 largest physician practice groups in the country. Although students are trained to work in a range of patient care and research areas and the school is committed to training physicians for rural health care, the UWSMPH has chosen seven core areas of medicine on which it focuses its resources: Aging, Cancer, Cardiovascular and Respiratory Sciences, Neuroscience, Population and Community Health Sciences, Rural Health, and Women's Health. In addition to its primary teaching site at UW Health, UWSMPH maintains teaching affiliations with the adjacent William S. Middleton Memorial Veteran's Hospital (VHA Madison), UnityPoint Meriter Hospital and SSM Health St. Mary's Hospital in Madison, Aurora Health Care in Milwaukee and Green Bay, Gundersen Health System in La Crosse, and the Marshfield Clinic in Marshfield.

Admissions to UWSMPH is competitive, with 7.6% of applicants accepted in 2007. The acceptance rate for out-of-state applicants is significantly lower; of 2,674 out-of-state applicants in 2007, 167 were interviewed for 34 spots, an acceptance rate of 3.7%; the in-state rate was 23.2%. The matriculates had an average GPA of 3.76 and an MCAT score of 32.

Programs
UWSMPH has a Medical Scientist Training Program, or MD/PhD program that is funded by the NIH. Additionally, the Wisconsin Academy for Rural Medicine (WARM) program exists for students intending to practice in rural areas, while the Training in Urban Medicine and Public Health (TRIUMPH) program exists for students interested in practicing in urban areas. Students who enroll in the WARM track spend the majority of their clinical years training through hospitals and clinics affiliated with the La Crosse-based Gundersen Health System, Marshfield-based Marshfield Clinic, or Green Bay-based Aurora BayCare. Students enrolled in TRIUMPH complete the majority of their clinical training in Milwaukee with Aurora Health Care.

Through the Statewide Campus initiative, medical students at UWSMPH who are not enrolled in WARM or TRIUMPH also complete some of their rotations at one of the aforementioned Statewide sites outside of Madison (Gundersen Health System, Marshfield Clinic, Aurora Bay Care, or Aurora Health Care–Milwaukee). The Statewide Campus initiative is based on the Wisconsin Idea, the principle that the university's influence should benefit the people of the State of Wisconsin, famously summarized in former UW–Madison President Charles R. Van Hise's statement: "I shall never be content until the beneficent influence of the University reaches every family of the state.”

Notable people
Notable alumni of the school include:
 Laurel Clark  (MD 1987), astronaut, participant in the Space Shuttle Columbia mission
 Helen Dickie  (MD 1937), pulmonologist who conducted landmark studies on farmer's lung and played an important role in eradicating tuberculosis from UW–Madison's campus
 Howard Engle (MD), physician and lead plaintiff in a landmark lawsuit against the tobacco industry
 Frederic E. Mohs (MD 1934), general surgeon who developed the Mohs surgery technique in dermatology while a medical student; later became a professor and surgeon at UW–Madison 
 Robert F. Schilling (MD 1943), developed the Schilling test for pernicious anemia and conducted research on Vitamin B12; was also a professor at UW–Madison

Notable past and present faculty include:

 Charles R. Bardeen, first dean of UWSMPH and the first graduate of the Johns Hopkins School of Medicine
 Vanessa Northington Gamble, physician who chaired the 1996 Legacy Committee to investigate the unethical nature of the Tuskegee Syphilis Study 
 Charles Heidelberger, developer of the anti-cancer drug 5-fluorouracil
 William Shainline Middleton, military physician who was a founder of the American Board of Internal Medicine and the second dean of UWSMPH
 Jonathan Patz, climate change researcher, member of the Intergovernmental Panel on Climate Change, and Director of the UW–Madison Global Health Institute
 Howard Temin, co-discoverer of the viral enzyme reverse transcriptase and 1975 Nobel Prize in Physiology or Medicine laureate
 James Thomson, cell biologist who derived the first human embryonic stem cell line in 1998 and derived a human induced pluripotent stem cell line in 2007
 Terri Young, prominent pediatric ophthalmologist and current chair of the UWSMPH Department of Ophthalmology and Visual Sciences

See also
Gundersen Lutheran Medical Center, La Crosse, Wisconsin

References

Educational institutions established in 1907
Medical schools in Wisconsin
Schools of public health in the United States
Medicine and Public Health
1907 establishments in Wisconsin